East Chezzetcook  is a rural community on the Eastern Shore outside of the Halifax Regional Municipality, Nova Scotia on the East Chezzetcook Road off of Trunk 7. This small French fishing village is home to many descendant Acadians.

Parks and Recreation
The Long Beach Provincial Park and Conrod's Beach is located in this community. Conrod's Beach is not maintained by any government or person. The Nathan Smith Park is also located here. In Spring 2020, the Gaetz Brook Greenway opened, beginning in East Chezzetcook. The rail trail was completed by SATA Trails. The trail ends in Musquodoboit Harbour and can be accessed by the Eastern Marine Legion 161, Gaetz Brook Junior High School, Pine Hill Drive and Stat Hill Road.

Communications
 The postal code is  B0J 1N0
 The telephone exchange is 902  827 -Aliant

References

Explore HRM

Communities in Halifax, Nova Scotia
General Service Areas in Nova Scotia